Angustopila is a genus of air-breathing land snails, terrestrial pulmonate gastropod mollusks in the subfamily Hypselostomatinae of the family Hypselostomatidae.

Species
Angustopila concava (Thompson & Upatham, 1997)
Angustopila dominikae Páll-Gergely & Hunyadi in Páll-Gergely, Hunyadi, Jochum & Asami, 2015
Angustopila elevata  (Thompson & Upatham, 1997)
Angustopila fabella Páll-Gergely & Hunyadi in Páll-Gergely, Hunyadi, Jochum & Asami, 2015
Angustopila huoyani Jochum, Slapnik & Páll-Gergely in Jochum, Slapnik, Kampschulte, Martels, Heneka & Pall-Gergely, 2014
Angustopila neglecta  (Benthem-Jutting, 1961)
Angustopila psammion Páll-Gergely, Vermeulen & Ankervan, 2022
Angustopila subelevata Páll-Gergely & Hunyadi in Páll-Gergely, Hunyadi, Jochum & Asami, 2015
Angustopila szekeresi Páll-Gergely & Hunyadi in Páll-Gergely, Hunyadi, Jochum & Asami, 2015
Angustopila tamlod (Panha & Burch, 1999)

References

Stylommatophora
Cave snails
Gastropod genera